Gallucci is an Italian surname which can also be found in the Italian diaspora. The family name is most prevalent in the Italian regions Campania, Lazio and Lombardy. In Campania the name is toponymic and derived from the municipality of Galluccio as well as connected to the Principality of Capua (900–1156), while in Lazio it can be traced back to the Latin name Gallutius. It should be distinguished from the similar names Galluccio, Galluzzi and Galluzzo.

Geographical distribution
As of 2014, 38.7% of all known bearers of the surname Gallucci were residents of Italy (frequency 1:14,165), 28.1% of the United States (1:115,490), 13.8% of Argentina (1:27,792), 9.0% of Brazil (1:204,512), 3.5% of Canada (1:94,354), 1.6% of Venezuela (1:165,051), 1.4% of England (1:365,788), 1.1% of France (1:527,838) and 1.0% of Switzerland (1:76,747).
 
In Italy, the frequency of the surname was higher than national average (1:14,165) in the following regions:
 1. Basilicata (1:1,999)
 2. Marche (1:3,022)
 3. Calabria (1:3,713)
 4. Abruzzo (1:5,216)
 5. Aosta Valley (1:5,308)
 6. Campania (1:5,916)
 7. Molise (1:8,162)
 8. Lazio (1:11,237)

People
 Brayden Gallucci (born 1999), Australian Ballet Dancer
 Dann Gallucci (born 1975), American songwriter, producer, musician and audio engineer
 Ed Gallucci (born 1947), American photographer 
 Fulgenzio Gallucci (1570–1632), Italian Roman Catholic prelate
 Giosue Gallucci (1864–1915), American crime boss
 John Gallucci Jr., American physical therapist and athletic trainer
 Jordan Gallucci (born 1998), Australian rules footballer
 Robert Gallucci (born 1946), American academic and diplomat
 Santiago Gallucci (born 1991), Argentine football midfielder

References

Italian-language surnames
Surnames of Italian origin
Italian toponymic surnames